Gibbonthophagus Balthasar, 1935 (type species: Onthophagus atripennis Waterhouse, 1875) is a subgenus of the scarab beetle genus Onthophagus within the subfamily Scarabaeinae of Scarabaeidae.

References

 Balthasar V., 1935. Onthophagus-arten Chinas, Japans und der angrenzenden Ländern. Folia Zoologica et Hydrobiologica, Riga, 8:303-353
 Balthasar V., 1963. Monographie der Scarabaeidae und Aphodidae der palaearktischen und Orientalischen Region. Coprinae (Onitini Oniticellini Onthophagini). Tschechoslowakische Akademie der Wissenschaften Prag. 2:1-627

Scarabaeidae